Dr. Akagi, known in Japan as , is a 1998 Japanese Comedy-drama film by director Shohei Imamura. For his work on the film, Yosuke Yamashita was awarded Best Film Score at the 1999 Mainichi Film Concours.

Plot 
The film concerns Dr. Akagi, a doctor on an island in the Seto Inland Sea area during World War II. He runs into conflict with the military while trying to combat a hepatitis epidemic. Akagi earns the nickname "Dr. Liver" (カンゾー先生 Kanzō-sensei) because of his work, though the townsfolk use it as a humorous dig at his persistent diagnosis. Though the broad circumstance of Japan slowly losing the war is the setting, many of the interactions and situations tilt into humor, for instance; the very music used for the doctor running from patient to patient has an upbeat and light-hearted tone.

Cast 
 Akira Emoto : Dr. Fûu Akagi
 Kumiko Asō : Sonoko Mannami
 Jacques Gamblin : Pete
 Tomorowo Taguchi : Nosaka
 Yukiya Kitamura : Sankichi
 Misa Shimizu : Gin
 Masatō Ibu : Ikeda
 Masanori Sera
 Ben Hiura
 Kaoru Mizuki
 Sanshō Shinsui
 Eri Watanabe
 Ayumi Ito
Dutch, British soldiers- US Marines from MCAS Iwakuni MALS-12, Japanese Rugby Team , and representatives of Teachers of English language in Japan.

See also
 1998 in film

References

External links
 
 Free to Roam  (film review) at chicagoreader.com.

Films directed by Shohei Imamura
1998 films
Japanese comedy films
Toei Company films
1990s Japanese films